Elections to the French National Assembly was held in the territory of Ivory Coast (which included Upper Volta at the time) on 2 June 1946 as part of the wider parliamentary elections. Voting was carried out using separate electoral colleges for citizens and non-citizens. André Schock and Félix Houphouët-Boigny were elected.

Results

First College

Second College

References

Ivory
1946 in French Upper Volta
1946 in Ivory Coast
Elections in Burkina Faso
Elections in Ivory Coast